The Wright R-760 Whirlwind was a series of seven-cylinder air-cooled radial aircraft engines built by the Wright Aeronautical division of Curtiss-Wright. These engines had a displacement of 756 in³ (12.4 L) and power ratings of 225-350 hp (168-261 kW).

Design and development
Wright introduced the J-6 Whirlwind family in 1928 to replace the nine-cylinder R-790 series. The J-6 family included varieties with five, seven, and nine cylinders.  The seven-cylinder version was originally known as the J-6 Whirlwind Seven, or J-6-7 for short.  The U.S. government designated it as the R-760; Wright later adopted this and dropped the J-6 nomenclature.

Like all the members of the J-6 Whirlwind family, the R-760 had larger cylinders than the R-790. The piston stroke of 5.5 in (14.0 cm) was unchanged, but the cylinder bore was expanded to 5.0 in (12.7 cm) from the R-790's bore of 4.5 in (11.4 cm). While the R-790 was naturally aspirated, the R-760, like the other J-6 engines, had a gear-driven supercharger to boost its power output.

Over time, Wright refined the R-760, using suffix letters to indicate successive versions. The original R-760 (or J-6-7) was rated for 225 hp (168 kW), while the R-760E of 1931 could do 250 hp (186 kW) thanks to an improved cylinder head design. Wright later added another suffix to show different power levels. The R-760E-1, introduced the same year as the R-760E, had a takeoff power rating of 300 hp (224 kW) thanks to higher-compression pistons and a greater RPM limit. The even more powerful R-760E-2 of 1935 could reach 350 hp (261 kW) for takeoff due to increased supercharging and an even higher RPM limit. On the other hand, the R-760E-T, designed for trainer aircraft, had the R-760E-1's high-compression pistons, but the supercharger was removed, thus giving just 235 hp (175 kW).

Operational history

The R-760 was a direct replacement for the R-790, with similar displacement and power. The U.S. Navy used it as the powerplant for several biplane primary trainers, including the Consolidated NY, the Curtiss N2C Fledgling, and the Naval Aircraft Factory N3N Canary. The last of these was produced in large numbers, with most of the engines built under license by the Naval Aircraft Factory. Trainers usually had the unsupercharged R-760E-T engine.

A variety of civil utility aircraft also used the R-760, including models built by Beechcraft, Cessna, Curtiss-Wright, Howard DGA-8, Stearman, Stinson, and Waco. These aircraft generally used the various supercharged versions of the R-760.

Production of the R-760 continued until 1945, with about 1400 examples being built by Wright, and more under licence by foreign manufacturers such as Fábrica Nacional de Motores in Brazil.

Variants
 J-6-7 (R-760): 225 hp (168 kW) at 2,000 RPM.
 R-760E: 250 hp (186 kW) at 2,000 RPM. Higher power from improved cylinder head.
 R-760E-1: 285 hp (213 kW) at 2,100 RPM, 300 hp (224 kW) at 2,250 RPM for takeoff. Higher compression ratio.
 R-760E-2: 320 hp (239 kW) at 2,200 RPM, 350 hp (261 kW) at 2,400 RPM for takeoff. Increased supercharging, slightly higher compression ratio.
 R-760E-T: 235 hp (175 kW) at 2,000 RPM. Naturally aspirated version of R-760E-1 for trainer aircraft.
 R-760-2, -4, -8: 235 hp (175 kW) at 2,000 RPM. U.S. Navy versions of R-760E-T.

Applications
Abrams P-1 Explorer
Beechcraft Staggerwing
Cessna DC-6B Scout
Consolidated NY-3
Curtiss N2C-2 Fledgling
Curtiss-Wright CW-A-14D Sportsman Deluxe
Fairchild Model 45
Howard DGA-8 and DGA-15W
Naval Aircraft Factory N3N Canary
St. Louis YPT-15
Stearman C3R Business Speedster
Stinson Junior
Stinson Reliant
Waco CSO and CTO
Waco CJC, CJC-S, DJC, DJC-S, and DJS 
Waco CUC, DQC-6, EQC-6, DGC-7 & 8, EGC-7 & 8 
Waco CRG

Engines on display
Wright R-760 engines on display are uncommon, but there is an R-760E-2 exhibited at the Evergreen Aviation & Space Museum in McMinnville, Oregon.

Specifications (R-760E-2)

See also

References

Notes

Bibliography

Gunston, Bill. World Encyclopedia of Aero Engines. Cambridge, England. Patrick Stephens Limited, 1989. 
Jane's Fighting Aircraft of World War II. London. Studio Editions Ltd, 1989. 
. Available from the Aircraft Engine Historical Society's reference page.
. Available from the Aircraft Engine Historical Society's reference page.
The following Federal Aviation Administration type certificate data sheets, all available from the FAA's Regulatory and Guidance Library:
R-760E: .
R-760E-1: .
R-760E-2: .
R-760E-T: .
R-760-2, -4, -8: .

External links

 Engine Data Sheets: US Aero Engines — first R-760 page, second R-760 page

1920s aircraft piston engines
Aircraft air-cooled radial piston engines
R-760